The History of China–United States relations covers the relations of the United States with the Qing and Republic eras. For history after the 1949 founding of the People's Republic of China, see China–United States relations.

American viewpoints
Harold Isaacs published Scratches on our Minds: American Images of China and India in 1955. By reviewing the popular and scholarly literature on Asia that appeared in the United States and by interviewing many American experts, Isaacs identified six stages of American attitudes toward China. They were "respect" (18th century), "contempt" (1840–1905), "benevolence" (1905 to 1937), "admiration" (1937–1944); "disenchantment" (1944–1949), and "hostility" (after 1949). In 1990, historian Jonathan Spence updated Isaac's model to include "reawakened curiosity" (1970–1974); "guileless fascination" (1974–1979), and "renewed skepticism" (1980s).

The Qing Dynasty and the United States of America

According to John Pomfret:
To America's founders, China was a source of inspiration. They saw it as a harmonious society with officials chosen on merit, where the arts and philosophy flourished, and the peasantry labored happily on the land. Benjamin Franklin venerated China's prison system and sought information on its senses, silk industry, and how its people heated their homes.... Thomas Paine compared Confucius to Jesus Christ. James Madison and Thomas Jefferson admired China's ability to close itself off from the outside world, finding virtue in its isolation. The Americans who actually went to China, by contrast, were befuddled and awed by the empire....Amasa Delano described China with the wonder of a country hayseed, contending that it, "is the first for greatness, riches and grandeur of any country ever known." Still, he too was distressed when he saw what appeared to be the corpses of mixed-blood babies floating down the Pearl River.

The newly independent United States dispatched consuls to Guangzhou as early as 1784—the first was Samuel Shaw, the supercargo on the Empress of China, These men had never been formally received by Chinese officials as state representatives. The two countries had acknowledged each other's existence before 1844, but the negotiations and treaty of that year marked the first recognition under international law. Formal diplomatic relations began 16 June 1844 as the countries engaged in the negotiations which led to the Treaty of Wangxia.

Old China Trade

Silver and gold coins, ginseng, and furs, and more prominently tea, cotton, silk, lacquerware, porcelain, and exotic furniture were traded. The first vessel from the United States that traded to China was the Empress of China in 1784.

The American merchants, mostly based in the East India Marine Society in Salem, Massachusetts, became wealthy, giving rise to America's first generation of millionaires. Chinese artisans began to notice the American desire for exotic wares and adjusted their practices accordingly, manufacturing goods made specifically for export. These export wares often sported American or European motifs in order to fully capitalize on the consumer demographic.

Missionaries

The first American missionary in China was Elijah Coleman Bridgman (1801–61), who arrived in 1830. He soon transcended his small-town New England prejudices against Chinese "idolatry," learned the Chinese language, and wrote a widely used history of the United States in Chinese. He founded the English-language journal The Chinese Repository in 1832, and it served as the chief source of information on Chinese culture and politics.

According to John Pomfret, The American missionaries were crucial to China's development. Along with Western-educated Chinese, they supplied the tools to break the stranglehold of traditional orthodoxy. They taught the Chinese Western science, critical thinking, sports, industry, and law. They established China's first universities and hospitals. These institutions, though now renamed, are still the best of their kind in China. "The Shanghai New-Letter suggests the outline of a plan by which China And America may enter upon a system of exchanges on a grand scale for their common benefit. The outline is given by a respected missionary in the north of China, where there is a plethora of labor and a dearth of skill; and where experience has convinced him that an exchange would be an advantageous for both countries. America need labor, China needs skill. China can furnish the first, America the second, and both would be benefitted by the furnishing. He would pour into each of the Western and Southern States a million laborers, men who by virtue of patient, industrious, and imitative habits are prepared to obey, to follow, and to execute; and would accept in return the larger brain, superior education, and stronger will which qualify Americans to originate, plan, and command. "Let them come to China," he says, "and fill the land with railroads, steamboats, and telegraphs. Let them develop her vast mines of coal, iron, gold, silver, copper, and lead. Let them light her cities with gas and supply them with water. Let them become physicians, teachers, and preachers. Let them create for her an army and navy, and command them for the good of the Chinese nation" etc. etc. By a proper distribution of brain and muscle, and a good understanding, the missionary anticipates the time when the empire and the republic will hold the destinies of the world."-Exchange of Skill for Labor---China and the United States, 1869, Scientific American

The women missionaries played a special role. They organized moralistic crusades against the traditional customs of female infanticide and foot-binding, helping to accomplish what Pomfret calls "the greatest human rights advances in modern Chinese history." Missionaries used physical education and sports to promote healthy life styles, to overturn class conventions by showing how the poor could excel, and by expanding gender roles using women's sports.

During the Boxer Rebellion of 1899–1901, Christian missions were burned, thousands of converts were executed, and the American missionaries barely escaped with their lives.

Paul Varg argues that American missionaries worked very hard on changing China:
 The growth of the missionary movement in the first decades of the [20th] century wove a tie between the American church-going public and China that did not exist between the United States and any other country. The number of missionaries increased from 513 in 1890 to more than 2,000 in 1914, and by 1920 there were 8,325 Protestant missionaries in China. In 1927 there were sixteen American universities and colleges, ten professional schools of collegiate rank, four schools of theology, and six schools of medicine. These institutions represented an investment of $19 million. By 1920, 265 Christian middle schools existed with an enrollment of 15,213. There were thousands of elementary schools; the Presbyterians alone had 383 primary schools with about 15,000 students.
Extensive fund-raising and publicity campaigns were held across the U.S. The Catholics in America also supported large mission operations in China.

President Woodrow Wilson was in touch with his former Princeton students who were missionaries in China, and he strongly endorsed their work. In 1916 he told a delegation of ministers: This is the most amazing and inspiring vision –- this vision of that great sleeping nation suddenly awakened by the voice of Christ. Could there be any greater contribution to the future momentum of the moral forces of the world than could be made by quickening the force, which is being set of foot in China? China is at present and poet; as a nation it is a congeries of parts, in each of which there is energy, but which are unbound in any essential and active unit, and just as soon as unity comes, its power will come in the world.

Caleb Cushing 

After the 1842 Treaty of Nanking at the end of the First Opium War in 1842, many Chinese ports were forced to open to foreign trade, which threatened American trade in the region. President John Tyler In 1843 appointed 
Massachusetts diplomat Caleb Cushing as commissioner and Minister. With the goal of impressing the Imperial Chinese court, the Cushing mission suddenly appeared with four Navy warships, loaded with gifts that exalted scientific wonders including revolvers, telescopes, and an encyclopedia. His arrival at Macau in February 1844 created a local sensation, but the Chinese government was reluctant to designate another most favored nation. Cushing cleverly mixed the carrot and stick. He warned – against the backdrop of his warships – that not to receive an envoy was a national insult. He threatened to go directly to the Emperor – an unheard of procedure. The Emperor tried delay, but he finally sent an envoy to negotiate with Cushing, leading to the signing of the Treaty of Wanghia in the village of Wanghia on 3 July 1844. In addition to most favored nation status, Cushing made sure that Americans received extraterritoriality, which meant that legal cases involving Americans inside China would be tried by Western judges, not by Chinese judges. In the following years American trade with China grew rapidly, thanks to the high-speed clipper ships which carried relatively small amounts of high-value cargo, such as ginseng and silk. American Protestant missionaries also began to arrive. The popular Chinese reaction was mostly hostile, but there was a favorable element that provided a base of support for American missionaries and businessmen. By 1850–64, China was enmeshed in the Taiping rebellion which cost millions of lives, and foreign trade stagnated.

During the Second Opium War, American and Qing forces briefly clashed in November 1856 at the Battle of the Barrier Forts, the first instance of military engagement between the two. After China's defeat in the Second Opium War, the Xianfeng Emperor fled Beijing. His brother Yixin, the Prince Gong, ratified the Treaty of Tientsin in the Convention of Peking on 18 October 1860. This treaty stipulated, among other terms, that along with Britain, France, and Russia, the United States would have the right to station legation offices in Beijing.

Taiwan

Some Americans suggested the annexation of Taiwan from China, but that idea won no support in Washington. Local aboriginals sometimes massacred shipwrecked Western sailors. In 1867, during the Rover incident, Taiwanese aborigines attacked shipwrecked American sailors, killing the entire crew. They subsequently defeated a retaliatory expedition by the American military and killed another American during the skirmish. (For the current issues facing Taiwan, see below)

The Burlingame Treaty and the Chinese Exclusion Act

In 1868, the Qing government appointed an American Anson Burlingame as their emissary to the United States. Burlingame toured the country to build support for equitable treatment for China and for Chinese emigrants. The 1868 Burlingame Treaty embodied these principles. In 1871, the Chinese Educational Mission brought the first of two groups of 120 Chinese boys to study in the United States. They were led by Yung Wing, the first Chinese student to graduate from an American college.

During the California Gold Rush and the construction of the transcontinental railroad, large numbers of Chinese emigrated to the U.S., spurring animosity from American citizens. After being forcibly driven from the mines, most Chinese settled in Chinatowns in cities such as San Francisco, taking up low-end wage labor, such as restaurant and cleaning work. With the post-Civil War economy in decline and the Long Depression having started by the 1870s, anti-Chinese animosity became politicized by labor leader Denis Kearney and his party, as well as by the California governor John Bigler. Both blamed Chinese coolies for depressed wage levels. In the first significant restriction on free immigration in U.S. history, Congress passed the Chinese Exclusion Act on 6 May 1882, following revisions made in 1880 to the Burlingame Treaty. Those revisions allowed the United States to suspend immigration, and Congress acted quickly to exclude Chinese skilled and unskilled laborers from entering the country for ten years, under penalty of imprisonment and deportation. The ban was renewed a number of times, lasting for over 60 years.

Searching for the China market
The American China Development Company, founded in 1895 by industrialists J.P. Morgan and Andrew Carnegie, sought to provide the American capital and management that would generate a rapid industrialization of China. It started building the Hankow-Canton Railroad, to link central and southern China. It only managed to finish 30 miles of line. Americans soon grew disillusioned, and sold out to a rival Belgian syndicate. On the whole, the American dream of getting rich by investing in China or selling to hundreds of millions of Chinese was almost always a failure. Standard Oil did succeed in selling kerosene for lamps to the China market, but few others made a profit.

The Boxer Rebellion

In 1899, a movement of Chinese nationalists calling themselves the Society of Right and Harmonious Fists started a violent revolt in northern China, referred to by Westerners as the Boxer Rebellion, against foreign influence in trade, politics, religion, and technology. The campaigns took place from November 1899 to 7 September 1901, during the final years of Manchu rule in China under the Qing dynasty.

The uprising began as an anti-foreign, anti-imperialist, peasant-based movement in northern China, in response to foreign westerners seizing land from locals, concession grabbing, and granting immunity to criminals who converted to Catholicism. The insurgents attacked foreigners, who were building railroads and violating Feng shui, and Christians, who were held responsible for the foreign domination of China. In June 1900, the Boxers entered Peking, and ransacked the area around the Foreign Legations. On 21 June, in response to the Western attack on the Chinese Dagu Forts, Empress Dowager Cixi declared war against all Western powers. Diplomats, foreign civilians, soldiers, and Chinese Christians were besieged during the Siege of the International Legations for 55 days. A coalition called the Eight-Nation Alliance comprising Austria-Hungary, France, Germany, Italy, Japan, Russia, Britain and the United States organized the Seymour Expedition with 2000 troops, including 116 Americans. They were repulsed by the Boxers at the Battle of Langfang. A much larger Allied force formed the Gaselee Expedition and it was successful due to internal rivalries among the Chinese forces.

The United States played a secondary but significant role in suppressing the Boxer Rebellion, largely due to the availability of warships stationed in the Philippines. In 1900-1901 American forces were included in the Allied occupation of Peking (Beijing). American commander, Colonel Adna Chaffee began public health, relief, and police operations in cooperation with Chinese officials. Chaffee concluded that Asiatics respected only the superior power. Reassigned to the Philippines he applied the lessons there, combining benevolence and public health measures with force and cooperation with local officials.

The Chinese paid indemnities to each of the powers. The U.S. used its $11 million share to promote cultural and educational exchanges and help China modernize. A number of schools were established in China, such as Tsinghua College in Peking.

With national attention focused on the Boxers, American Protestants made missions to China a high priority. They supported 500 missionaries in 1890, more than 2000 in 1914, and 8300 in 1920. By 1927 they opened 16 American universities, six medical schools, and four theology schools, together with 265 middle schools and a large number of elementary schools. The number of converts was not large, but the educational influence was dramatic.

Open Door Policy

In the 1890s the major world powers (France, Britain, Germany, Japan, and Russia) began proposing spheres of influence for themselves in China, which was then under the Qing dynasty. The United States demanded these proposals to be discarded so that all nations could trade on an equal footing. In 1899, U.S. Secretary of State John Hay sent diplomatic letters to these nations, asking them to guarantee the territorial and administrative integrity of China and to not interfere with the free use of treaty ports within their theoretical spheres of influence. The major powers evaded commitment, saying they could not agree to anything until the other powers had consented first. Hay took this as acceptance of his proposal, which came to be known as the Open Door Policy.

While respected internationally, the Open Door Policy was ignored by Russia and Japan when they encroached in Manchuria. The U.S. protested Russia's actions. Japan and Russia fought the Russo-Japanese War in 1904, in which the U.S. mediated a peace. Japan also presented a further challenge to the policy with its Twenty-One Demands in 1915 made on the then-Republic of China. Japan also made secret treaties with the Allied Powers promising Japan the German territories in China. In 1931, Japan invaded and occupied Manchuria. The United States along with other countries condemned the action, leading to U.S. support for China in its war with Japan after 1937.

The Republic of China and the U.S.

1911–1937
After the Xinhai Revolution in 1911, Washington recognized the new Government of the Chinese Republic as the sole and legitimate government of China. In practice a number of powerful regional warlords were in control and the central government handled foreign policy and little else. The Twenty-One Demands were a set of secret demands made in 1915 by Japan to Yuan Shikai the general who served as president of the Republic of China The demands would greatly extend Japanese control. Japan would keep the former German concessions it had conquered at the start of World War I in 1914. Japan would be stronger in Manchuria and South Mongolia. It would have an expanded role in railways. The most extreme demands (in section 5) would gave Japan a decisive voice in China's finance, policing, and government affairs. Indeed, fifth section would make China in effect a protectorate of Japan, and thereby reduce Western influence. Japan was in a strong position, as the Western powers were in a stalemated war with Germany. Britain and Japan had a military alliance since 1902, and in 1914 London had asked Tokyo to enter the war. Beijing published the secret demands and appealed to Washington and London. They were sympathetic and pressured Tokyo. In the final 1916 settlement, Japan gave up its fifth set of demands. It gained a little in China, but lost a great deal of prestige and trust in the U.S. and Britain. The U.S. State Department argued in January 1915:
Our present commercial interests in Japan are greater than those in China, but the look ahead shows our interest to be a strong and independent China rather than one held in subjection by Japan. China has certain claims upon our sympathy. If we do not recognize them, as we refuse to recognize Korea's claim, we are in danger of losing our influence in the Far East and of adding to the dangers of the situation.

Bruce Elleman has argued that Wilson did not betray China at the Paris Peace Conference when he accepted the transfer of the German concession in Shandong to Japan, instead of allowing China to reclaim it. Wilson's action was in accord with widely recognized treaties which China had signed with Japan during the war. Wilson tried to get Japan to promise to return the concessions in 1922, but the Chinese delegation rejected that compromise. The result in China was the growth of intense nationalism characterized by the May Fourth Movement, and the tendency of intellectuals and activists in the 1920s to look to Moscow for leadership.

In 1922 the Nine-Power Treaty signed by Washington, Beijing, Tokyo and London, and others, contained explicit protections for China.

Frank Kellogg was the Secretary of State (1925–1929) and he followed the advice of Nelson Johnson, the new chief of the Division of Far Eastern Affairs. They favored China and protected it from threats from Japan. The key to Chinese sovereignty in foreign policy was to gain control of tariff rates, which Western powers had set at a low 5%, and to end the extra territoriality by which Britain and the others controlled Shanghai and other treaty ports. Kellogg and Johnson successfully negotiated tariff reform with China, thereby giving enhanced status to the Kuomintang and helping get rid of the unequal treaties. China was reunified by a single government, led by the Kuomintang (KMT) in 1928. With American help China achieved some of its diplomatic goals in 1928–1931.

Starting in the 1870s, American missionaries began developing educational institutions in China. They discovered the demand for Western education was much stronger, and much more elite, than the demand for Christianity. Programs were set up to fund Chinese students In American colleges. Pearl S. Buck was an American, born in the United States but raised in China. Her best sellers and lectures generated wide American support for the Chinese peasantry. President Woodrow Wilson was in touch with his former students who were missionaries in China, and he strongly endorsed their work.

World War II

The outbreak of the Second Sino-Japanese War in 1937 saw massive military and economic aid start to flow into the Republic of China (ROC), from the United States under President Franklin D. Roosevelt. A series of Neutrality Acts forbade American aid to countries at war. Because the Second Sino-Japanese War was undeclared, however, Roosevelt denied that a state of war existed in China and proceeded to send aid to Chiang. American public sympathy for the Chinese was aroused by reports from missionaries, novelists such as Pearl S. Buck, and Time Magazine of Japanese brutality in China, including reports surrounding the Nanking Massacre, also known as the 'Rape of Nanking'. Japanese-American relations were further soured by the USS Panay incident during the bombing of Nanjing, in which a Yangtze Patrol gunboat of the US Navy was accidentally sunk by Imperial Japanese Navy Air Service bombers. Roosevelt demanded an apology and compensation from the Japanese, which was received, but relations between the two countries continued to deteriorate. American public opinion overwhelmingly favored China and denounced Japan.

The United States strongly supported China starting in 1937 and warned Japan to get out. American financial and military aid began to flow. Claire Lee Chennault commanded the 1st American Volunteer Group (nicknamed Flying Tigers), with American pilots flying American warplanes painted with the Chinese flag to attack the Japanese. He headed both the volunteer group and the uniformed U.S. Army Air Forces units that replaced it in 1942. The United States cut off Japan's main oil supplies in 1941 to force it to compromise regarding China, but instead Japan attacked American, British and Dutch possessions in the western Pacific.

Plan to bomb Japan
In 1940, a year before Pearl Harbor, Washington developed an ambitious plan for a sneak attack on Japanese bases. The U.S. would send in an American airforce wearing Chinese uniforms (the Flying Tigers). They would bomb Japan. The U.S. Army was opposed to this scheme and raised obstacles, noting that being able to reach Japan depended on the National Revolutionary Army being able to build and protect airfields and bases close enough to Japan, which they doubted he could do. The generals had little confidence in the scheme. Ignoring the Army's advice, American civilian leaders were captivated by the idea of China attacking Japan by air. Enthusiastic approval came Treasury Secretary Henry Morgenthau Jr. and President Franklin D. Roosevelt himself. However, the proposed attack never took place: The Chinese had not built and secured any runways or bases close enough to reach Japan, just as the Army had warned. The American bombers and crews were delayed and finally arrived shortly after the Japanese attack on Pearl Harbor. They were used for the war in Burma, as they lacked the range to reach Japan from secure bases in China.

US declares war

The United States formally declared war on Japan in December 1941. The Roosevelt administration gave massive amounts of aid to Chiang's beleaguered government, now headquartered in Chungking. Madame Chiang Kai-shek, the American-educated wife of ROC President Chiang Kai-shek, addressed the US Congress and toured the country to rally support for China. Congress amended the Chinese Exclusion Act and Roosevelt moved to end the unequal treaties by establishing the Treaty for Relinquishment of Extraterritorial Rights in China. However, the perception that Chiang's government was unable to effectively resist the Japanese or that he preferred to focus more on defeating the Communists grew. China Hands such as Joseph "Vinegar Joe" Stilwell—who spoke fluent Mandarin Chinese—argued that it was in American interest to establish communication with the Communists to prepare for a land-based counteroffensive invasion of Japan. The Dixie Mission, which began in 1943, was the first official American contact with the Communists. Other Americans, such as Claire Lee Chennault, argued for air power and supported Chiang's position. In 1944, Chennault successfully demanded that Stilwell be recalled. General Albert Coady Wedemeyer replaced Stilwell, and Patrick J. Hurley became ambassador.

Civil War in Mainland China

After World War II ended in 1945, the hostility between the Nationalists and the Communists exploded into the open Chinese Civil War. President Truman dispatched General George Marshall to China to mediate, but the Marshall Mission was not successful. In February 1948, Marshall, now Secretary of State, testified to Congress in secret session that he had realized from the start that the Nationalists could never defeat the Communists in the field, so some sort of negotiated settlement was necessary or else the United States would have to fight the war. He warned:
Any large-scale United States effort to assist the Chinese Government to oppose the Communists would most probably degenerate into a direct U.S. undertaking and responsibility, involving the commitment of sizable forces and resources over an indefinite period. Such a dissipation of U.S. resources would inevitably play into the hands of the Russians, or would provoke a reaction which would possibly, even probably, lead to another Spanish type of revolution or general hostilities....the cost of an all-out effort to see Communist forces resisted and destroyed in China...would clearly be out of all proportion to the results to be obtained.

When it became clear that the KMT would lose effective control of China in 1949, Secretary of State Dean Acheson directed the publication of the China White Paper to explain American policy and defend against critics (e.g., the American China Policy Association) who asked "Who Lost China?" He announced that the United States would "wait for the dust to settle" before recognizing the new government. Chinese Military forces under Chiang Kai-shek had gone to the island of Taiwan to accept the surrender of Japanese troops, thus beginning the military occupation of Taiwan, and withdrew to the island from 1948 to 1949. Chinese Communist Party Chairman Mao Zedong established the People's Republic of China on mainland China, while Taiwan and other islands are still under the control of the Republic of China.

See also
 Republic of China–United States relations for relations since 1948
 People's Republic of China–United States relations for relations since 1979
 Stilwell and the American Experience in China, 1911–45, book by Barbara W. Tuchman
 East Asia–United States relations
Foreign relations of the Republic of China
Economic history of China (1912–1949)
History of China
History of the Republic of China

References

Further reading 
 Song, Yuwu, ed. Encyclopedia of Chinese-American Relations (McFarland, 2006)
 Sutter, Robert G. Historical Dictionary of United States-China Relations (2005).
 Brazinsky, Gregg. "The Birth of a Rivalry: Sino‐American Relations during the Truman Administration" in Daniel S. Margolies, ed., A Companion to Harry S. Truman (2012): 484–97.
 Burns, Richard Dean, and Edward Moore Bennett, eds. Diplomats in crisis: United States-Chinese-Japanese relations, 1919–1941 (1974) short articles by scholars from all three countries. online free to borrow
 Chang, Gordon H. Fateful Ties: A History of America's Preoccupation with China. (Harvard UP, 2015). excerpt
 Ch'i Hsi-sheng. Nationalist China at War: Military Defeats and Political Collapse, 1937–1945 (1982).
 Cohen, Warren I. America's Response to China: A History of Sino-American Relations (5th ed. 2010)
 Dreyer, Edward L. China at War, 1901-1949 (1995). 422 pp.
 Dulles, Foster Rhea. China and America: The Story of Their Relations Since 1784 (1981), general survey
Eastman Lloyd. Seeds of Destruction: Nationalist China in War and Revolution, 1937–1945 (1984).
Eastman Lloyd et al. The Nationalist Era in China, 1927–1949 (1991). excerpt and text search
 Ellis, L. Ethan. Republican foreign policy, 1921–1933 (Rutgers UP, 1968) pp 291–364. online
 Erskine, Kristopher C. "Frank and Harry Price: Diplomatic Backchannels Between the United States and China During World War II." American Journal of Chinese Studies (2017): 105–120.
 Fairbank, John K. China and the United States (4th ed. 1979) online, strong on history
 Feis, Herbert. The China Tangle (1967), diplomacy during World War II online
 Gedalecia, David. "Letters From the Middle Kingdom: The Origins of America's China Policy," Prologue, 34.4 (Winter, 2002), pp. 260–73.
 Ghosh, Partha Sarathi. "Sino-American Economic Relations 1784–1929: A Survey." China Report 12.4 (1976): 16–27 online. 
 Green, Michael J. By more than providence: Grand strategy and American power in the Asia Pacific since 1783 (Columbia UP, 2017). online
 Greene, Naomi. From Fu Manchu to Kung Fu Panda: Images of China in American Film (U of Hawai'i Press; 2014) 288 pp.; explores the changing image of China and the Chinese in the American cultural imagination, beginning with D.W. Griffiths's "Broken Blossoms"(1919).
 Haddad, John R. America's First Adventure in China: Trade, Treaties, Opium, and Salvation (2013) covers 1784 to 1868. 
 Isaacs, Harold R. Scratches on Our Minds: American Images of China and India (1958) online
 Johnson, Kendall A. The New Middle Kingdom: China and the Early American Romance of Free Trade (Johns Hopkins University Press, 2017).
 Kissinger, Henry. On China (2011) excerpt
 Latourette, Kenneth Scott. The history of early relations between the United States and China, 1784–1844 (1917) online
 Li, Jing. China's America: The Chinese View the United States, 1900–2000. (State University of New York Press, 2011)
 Link, Arthur S. Wilson, Volume III: The Struggle for Neutrality, 1914–1915 (1960) pp 267–308; online
 Madsen, Richard. China and the American Dream (1994)
 May, Ernest R. and James C. Thomson, Jr., eds., American-East Asian relations: a survey (1972).
 May, Ernest R. and John King Fairbank, eds. America’s China Trade in Historical Perspective (1986)
 Morse, Hosea Ballou. International Relations of the Chinese Empire: The Period of Conflict: 1834–1860 (1910) online 
 Morse, Hosea Ballou. International Relations of the Chinese Empire: The Period of Subjection: 1894–1911 (1918) online
 Morse, Hosea Ballou. International Relations of the Chinese Empire: The Period of Submission: 1861–1893 (1918) online
 Morse, Hosea Ballou. The Trade and Administration of the Chinese Empire (1908) online
 Oksenberg, Michel and Robert B. Oxnam, eds. Dragon and Eagle (1978),
Pakula, Hannah. The Last Empress: Madame Chiang Kai-shek and the Birth of Modern China (2009) excerpt and text search
 Pederson, William D. ed. A Companion to Franklin D. Roosevelt (2011) online pp 590–611, covers American diplomacy in WW2
 Pomfret, John. The Beautiful Country and the Middle Kingdom: America and China, 1776 to the Present (2016) review
 Reed, James. The Missionary Mind and American East Asian Policy, 1911–1915 (1983), focus on Wilson; online review 
 Riccards, Michael P. The Presidency and the Middle Kingdom (2000)
 Richards, Rhys. "United States trade with China, 1784–1814," The American Neptune, (1994), Special Supplement to Vol 54. 
 Ryan, Joseph P. "American Contributions to the Catholic Missionary Effort in China in the Twentieth Century." Catholic Historical Review 31.2 (1945): 171–180 online.
 Schaller, Michael. The United States and China: Into the Twenty-First Century 4th ed 2015) online 1979 edition
 Spence, Jonathan D. To Change China: Western Advisers in China (1980) excerpt
 Spence, Jonathan. "Western Perceptions of China from the Late Sixteenth Century to the Present" in Paul S. Ropp, ed.Heritage of China: Contemporary Perspectives on Chinese Civilization (1990) excerpts
 Sugita, Yoneyuki. "The Rise of an American Principle in China: A Reinterpretation of the First Open Door Notes toward China" in Richard J. Jensen, Jon Thares Davidann, and Yoneyuki Sugita, eds. Trans-Pacific relations: America, Europe, and Asia in the twentieth century (Greenwood, 2003). ISBN 978-0-275-97714-6. pp. 3–20
 Tuchman, Barbara. Stilwell and the American Experience in China, 1911–1945 (1971) Online
 Varg, Paul A. "Sino-American Relations Past and Present." Diplomatic History 4.2 (1980): 101–112. online
 Varg, Paul A. The making of a myth: the United States and China 1897–1912 (1968) 11 essays on relationships.
 Varg, Paul. Missionaries, Chinese, and Diplomats: The American Protestant Missionary Movement in China, 1890–1952 (1958) online
 Wang, Dong. The United States and China: A History from the Eighteenth Century to the Present (2013)
 Xia, Yafeng and Zhi Liang. "China's Diplomacy toward the United States in the Twentieth Century: A Survey of the Literature," Diplomatic History 42:1 (April 2017): 241–264.

China White Paper 1949
Lyman Van Slyke, ed. The China White Paper: August 1949 (1967: 2 vol. Stanford U.P.); 1124 pp.; copy of official U.S. Department of State. China White Paper: 1949 vol 1 online at Google; online vol 1 pdf; vol 1 consists of history; vol 2 consists of primary sources and is not online; see library holdings via World Cat
excerpts appear in Barton Bernstein and Allen J. Matusow, eds. The Truman Administration: A Documentary History (1966), pp. 299–355.

Notes

 
China
United States